In Solitary Witness: The Life and Death of Franz Jägerstätter is a book written by Gordon Zahn originally published in 1964.

Its subject is the conscientious objector Blessed Franz Jägerstätter.

Overview 
Zahn, a Catholic and a pacifist, first heard of Jägerstätter in 1956, while doing research for an earlier book, German Catholics and Hitler's Wars. He was impressed and inspired by Jägerstätter's story and felt that it deserved a wider audience: “it was enough to convince me that this was indeed an amazing story, one deserving the widest possible attention".

Unlike some other conscientious objectors, Jägerstätter “came from a social background that one would ordinarily not associate with such an overtly rebellious act." Jägerstätter was a peasant living and working in the small upper Austrian village of St. Radegund. A farmer struggling to survive in a village of farmers struggling to survive, when Jägerstätter was “presented with his orders to serve in a war he considered unjust—a war, moreover, which he felt would serve the evil purposes of an intrinsically immoral political regime—refused to comply, and in his refusal accepted the death he knew would follow.”

Questions Explored

Zahn's biography explores three main questions:
 Why did Jägerstätter rebel and what made him so determined in his refusal to participate in the Nazi regime?
 How did others react to his rebellion?
 How is he now regarded?

Why did Franz Jägerstätter rebel?
Zahn points out that during his interviews and research he discovered “two Jägerstätters: an “early” Franz, and a “new” man, who appeared after a sudden and complete change about the time of his marriage.” Zahn portrays the “early” Jägerstätter as an average student who villagers referred to as “jolly, robust, fun-loving", and “a little wild in his ways". Jägerstätter was known the man who “brought the first motorcycle to the community”  and Zahn emphasizes that “it was clear that this event holds an important place in the memories of his former friends and neighbours as evidence of his personal daring and his fortschrittlich (“progressive”) tendencies."

As Zahn frequently admits, there are inevitable difficulties in presenting Jägerstätter’s biography—mainly problems relevance. One of these is that of Jägerstätter’s temporary exile from the community in which “the young man spent several years—the actual length of time could not be determined—working in the iron mines of the Steiermark area.” Zahn calls this an event “surrounded by confusion and mystery." It is unclear as to whether the temporary exile was imposed or voluntary, but it is said that Jägerstätter “had gotten himself into ‘some trouble.’”

This “trouble” is difficult to pinpoint but Zahn offers three explanations. The first is that Jägerstätter “had cut down a tree on the other family’s property” and property boundary conflict ensued. The second involves a personal conflict with another local boy and “centered on some kind of fight over a girl.” The third explanation for his exile is that “Franz had fathered an illegitimate child.”

Around the time of his marriage in 1936 Jägerstätter became a new man. Though Zahn admits that most villagers believed that Jägerstätter changed as a result of his marriage to a devout woman: “when people had described the change that had taken place in Jägerstätter, they all believed that Mrs Jägerstätter had much to do with it.” Though it is easy to assume that Jägerstätter's change was a result of his marriage, Zahn is careful to point out that “the illegitimate child, the exile from St. Radegund, and the subsequent emergence of a “new” Jägerstätter are intimately linked.”

Regardless of the precise reason why Franz changed “from one extreme to the other,” the point of most importance is that Jägerstätter developed “an intense and open religiosity and [a] thoroughgoing opposition to the Nazi regime.” Jägerstätter sang “hymns while he worked or while on his way to and from the parish church,” he “could sometimes be observed saying the rosary while plowing—or even interrupting his farm work to say a few prayers or read a bit in the Bible," and “had even been known to object to mowing the fields because he would be ‘killing God’s flowers’ in the process.” Jägerstätter “stopped playing cards and gave up certain other diversions which gave him pleasure as a youth." He “‘took penances and fastings upon himself and impored heaven for enlightenment and strength’” and “had begun to receive Holy Communion daily”. Jägerstätter became sexton of his local parish. Zahn's portrayal of the “new” Jägerstätter gives an impression of him as an intensely devout Catholic and of completely devout man.

Jägerstätter was also in “total opposition to the Nazi regime and its policies” not only inwardly, but also in “outward opposition” which Zahn emphasizes was “surprisingly so if one considers the penalties that could, and often did, follow any expression of criticism or opposition.” While others in his community remained silent, Jägerstätter responded, “‘Pfui Hitler!’” whenever he was greeted by the usual ‘Heil Hitler!’”and he even withdrew from his local peasants organization when it refused to oppose the Nazi movement.

After Nazi troops has crossed into and annexed Austria, Jägerstätter was the lone voice of opposition in the local plebiscite: “It was a matter of common knowledge in St. Radegund that Jägerstätter did not cast one of the Ja votes which, in his opinion, represented a betrayal of Church and nation.” Though “the published vote did register one hundred per cent approval in St. Radegund, in spite of the fact that Franz had cast a negative vote” some reports suggested “that the peasant had not voted against the proposal but had, instead, cast an intentionally ‘void’ ballot.” Zahn declares that “this marked the first step in a continuing series of refusals to co-operate that was to culminate in the action which cost him his life."

Jägerstätter's rebellion met its pitch on March 2, 1943 when he was scheduled to report to the military induction centre in Enns. One day prior, in a letter to his wife he wrote: “Today I am going to take the difficult step." Zahn notes that Franz's purpose of “writing was not only to pass on the news of his own decision but, beyond that, to thank his wife from the bottom of my heart for all the love and fidelity which you have brought me and the whole family. And for all the sacrifices you must still undergo on my account [italics indicate Jägerstätter’s own words]." Jägerstätter was well aware of the implications of his rebellion and refusal to fight not only to himself, but also to his wife and daughters. This was not a decision that was entered into lightly, but was one which he was thoroughly convinced.

How did others react?
The very title of the biography, “In Solitary Witness,” indicates that Jägerstätter's rebellion against the Nazi regime and policies was a solitary one. Zahn discusses the reactions of his fellow villagers, his fellow members of the Catholic community, and his family.

Villagers

It is difficult to characterize the opinions of the villagers except to state that “while all the others ‘did their duty’ by accepting without protest or hesitancy the military service demanded of them, this man [Jägerstätter]—and only he—took an open and final stand against the regime, against the war, and even against the victory for which the rest of them were hoping.” Despite the solitary nature of Jägerstätter’s rebellion, Zahn says that it could be said that within the people of St. Radegund “the absence of open resentment or animosity may be taken as an accurate characterization of the community’s attitude at the time." At the same time, Zahn suggests that there was a feeling of civic duty that was required and ignored by Jägerstätter: “everybody had his duty to perform in wartime, and that even priests had accepted the call to service.” There is also “general agreement that he had not been sufficiently concerned about the welfare of his family.”

Some villagers call Jägerstätter's mental stability into some question according to Zahn: “It was generally taken as a self-evident fact that his political and religious fanaticism had finally combined to unsettle him mentally.” This opinion is not universal as Zahn says that “the few who did not share this evaluation of Franz’s mental condition—his wife, Pastor Karobath, Fr. Furthauer…—would have been in no position to challenge the community judgment, and would have found it difficult to do so had they made the effort.” Though perhaps perceived by his community as unusual and seen to be “‘touched in the head,’” Jägerstätter’s fanaticism grated against the views and actions of his community.

Zahn concludes: “To sum it up succinctly, the community continues to reject Jägerstätter’s stand as a stubborn and pointless display of essentially political imprudence, or even an actual failure to fulfill a legitimate duty. It is to be explained and forgiven in terms of an unfortunate mental aberration brought about, or at least intensified, by religious excess. The question of whether his action was morally right is, for the most part, set aside. While some of the villagers were quite willing to accept the possibility that he might someday be formally acknowledged as a saint, this possibility was not considered at all incompatible with the community’s general disapproval of his action.”

Religious Community

At numerous times Zahn provides evidence that Jägerstätter was advised by his religious community to give up his rebellion. In response to the plebiscite, “Fr. Karobath, himself an opponent of the Nazis, argued that it would be pointless: “he should report for service as ordered.” Bishop Fliesser is quoted as offering the advice: “To no avail I spelled out for him the moral principles defining the degree of responsibility borne by citizens and private individuals for the acts of civil authority. I reminded him of his far greater responsibility for his own state of life, in particular for his family.”

Jägerstätter's Family

Jägerstätter's letters provide evidence that he loved his family: “Dearest wife and mother! I thank you once more from the bottom of my heart for everything that you have done for me in my lifetime, for all the love and sacrifice that you have borne for me: and I beg you again forgive me if I have hurt or offended you, just as I have forgiven everything.” He reassures his wife that she need not worry herself about his imprisonment and trial: “Dearest wife, as long as I am not unhappy, there is no need for you to be heavy of heart or to weep.”

Jägerstätter's attorney, Friedrich Leo Feldmann, defended him and encouraged him to end his rebellion. He wrote to “the Catholic pastor of St. Radegund” upon Franz's condemnation to death: “The sentence is not yet binding…Jägerstätter can still be saved, but only if he abandons his totally senseless position and declares himself ready to accept military service.” He pleads for Mrs. Jägerstätter to come to Berlin to attempt to persuade her husband: “Perhaps it would be possible for them to come here without delay and personally try once again to influence this man."

Mrs. Jägerstätter tells Zahn that “she knew people thought that she did not try to get him to get his mind, but that this was simply not true. She knew he would die if he could not be persuaded to abandon his position, and she certainly did not want him to die.” Though sentenced to death and visited by his wife who “tried to prevail him to change his mind,” Jägerstätter refused and maintained his rebellion.

How is he regarded now?
Zahn's biography, published in 1964, outlines some of the responses to Jägerstätter's life and death:

Reviews
The book is considered to be a biographical account which has since become a classic.

References 

1964 non-fiction books
American biographies
Catholic resistance to Nazi Germany